Idactus is a genus of longhorn beetles of the subfamily Lamiinae.

 Idactus ashanticus Breuning, 1960
 Idactus bettoni Gahan, 1898
 Idactus blairi Breuning, 1935
 Idactus browni Breuning, 1981
 Idactus burgeoni Breuning, 1935
 Idactus coquereli (Fairmaire, 1890)
 Idactus cristulatus (Fairmaire, 1886)
 Idactus damarensis Breuning, 1938
 Idactus ellioti Gahan, 1890
 Idactus exiguus (Quedenfeldt, 1891)
 Idactus flavovittatus Teocchi, 1986
 Idactus fuscovittatus Breuning, 1971
 Idactus hieroglyphicus (Taschenberg, 1883)
 Idactus iranicus Breuning, 1975
 Idactus konso Quentin & Villiers, 1981  
 Idactus lateralis Gahan, 1898
 Idactus maculicornis Gahan, 1890
 Idactus minimus Teocchi & Sudre, 2002
 Idactus multifasciculatus Breuning, 1938
 Idactus nigroplagiatus Breuning, 1935
 Idactus paramaculicornis Breuning, 1973
 Idactus rusticus Aurivillius, 1916
 Idactus spinipennis Gahan, 1890
 Idactus strandi Breuning, 1935
 Idactus tridens Pascoe, 1864
 Idactus tuberculatus Quedenfeldt, 1885
 Idactus usambaricus Hintz, 1910
 Idactus verdieri Lepesme & Breuning, 1956

References

Ancylonotini